Landscript is a word created by architect Seung H-Sang to describe his architecture. He published a book with this word as well. In that book, he describes it as follows:

References

2000s neologisms
Architectural terminology